Per Johan Sjöberg (born 14 November 1980 in Borås) is a retired Swedish footballer who played as a defender. His last club was IF Elfsborg.

Club career

Youth years
Sjöberg played for Mariedals IK until 1997 when he left the club for IF Elfsborg.

IF Elfsborg
He was regular in the starting line-up until injuries enabled him to play.

International career
In 2000, he played for the Swedish national under-21 football team.

Personal life
Sjöberg is very popular with IF Elfsborg's supporters and is called Kapten Blod (Captain Blood).

References

1980 births
Living people
Swedish footballers
Association football defenders
Allsvenskan players
IF Elfsborg players
People from Borås
Sportspeople from Västra Götaland County